"I'm Hitting the Trail to Normandy: So Kiss Me Goodbye" is a World War I song written and composed by Charles A. Snyder and Oscar Doctor. The song was published in 1917 by Snyder Music Co. in New York City. The sheet music cover, illustrated by E. H. Pfeiffer, depicts a soldier kissing a woman good-bye with an inset photo of Paul Elwood.

The sheet music can be found at the Pritzker Military Museum & Library.

References

Bibliography 

1917 songs
Songs about France
Songs about kissing
Songs about parting
Songs of World War I